The Wujiang Viaduct is a  long viaduct in Wujiangzhen, Zunyi County, Guizhou, China. Before the viaduct was constructed traffic had to descend into the valley and cross the Zunyi Bridge.

See also
Zunyi Bridge
List of tallest bridges in the world

External links
http://highestbridges.com/wiki/index.php?title=Wujiang_Bridge_Lanhai

Box girder bridges in China
Bridges in Guizhou
Bridges completed in 2008